Madcap's Flaming Duty is the ninety-eighth release and twenty-seventh major studio album by Tangerine Dream. Along with Cyclone (1978) and Tyger (1987) it is one of the few Tangerine Dream releases to feature vocals. The album is a tribute to Syd Barrett who died in 2006; the title references Barrett's album The Madcap Laughs. This is the first album to feature Bernhard Beibl who would remain a member until 2014.

Track listing

Personnel
 Tangerine Dream
 Edgar Froese – keyboards, guitars, drum programming, harmonica
 Thorsten Quaeschning – keyboards, drum programming, vocals
 Linda Spa – flute
 Iris Camaa – percussion
 Bernhard Beibl – guitars, violin, mandolin Additional musicians
 Chris Hausl – vocals
 Gynt Beator – Irish bouzouki
 Thomas Beator – Irish bouzouki

References

2007 albums
Tangerine Dream albums